Robert Crifo (born November 10, 1965) is a former Canadian football wide receiver who played eight seasons in the Canadian Football League (CFL) with the Winnipeg Blue Bombers, Ottawa Rough Riders, Saskatchewan Roughriders, Toronto Argonauts and Hamilton Tiger-Cats. He was drafted by the Winnipeg Blue Bombers in the third round of the 1988 CFL Draft. He played CIS football at the University of Toronto. Crifo was also a member of the Montreal Alouettes.

Professional career
Crifo was selected by the Winnipeg Blue Bombers of the CFL with the 21st pick in the 1988 CFL Draft. He was named an East All-Star in 1991 after recording 39 receptions. He earned East All-Star honors again in 1992 after recording 53 receptions. Crifo was released by the Blue Bombers in September 1993. He signed with the Ottawa Rough Riders of the CFL in September 1993 and caught 15 passes in seven games. He was traded to the Saskatchewan Roughriders in May 1994 and released by the team in August 1994. Crifo signed with the CFL's Toronto Argonauts in 1994 and became a free agent after the 1995 season. He was signed by the Montreal Alouettes of the CFL prior to the 1996 season and released by the team in June 1996. He signed with the CFL's Hamilton Tiger-Cats in September 1996 and was released by the team in November 1996.

References

External links
Just Sports Stats

Living people
1965 births
Players of Canadian football from Ontario
Canadian football wide receivers
Canadian football running backs
Canadian football slotbacks
Toronto Varsity Blues football players
Winnipeg Blue Bombers players
Ottawa Rough Riders players
Saskatchewan Roughriders players
Toronto Argonauts players
Hamilton Tiger-Cats players
Canadian football people from Toronto